Solidago mollis is a North American species of flowering plant in the family Asteraceae known by the common names velvety goldenrod, soft goldenrod or Ashly goldenrod. It is native to the central United States and central Canada, primarily the Great Plains from the Canadian Prairie Provinces south as far as Texas and New Mexico.

One plant can produce as many as 300 small yellow flower heads in a branching array at the top of the plant.

References

External links
 Minnesota Department of Natural Resources
 

mollis
Plants described in 1834
Flora of Western Canada
Flora of the Northwestern United States
Flora of the North-Central United States
Flora of the South-Central United States